Gmina Zduny may refer to either of the following administrative districts in Poland:
Gmina Zduny, Greater Poland Voivodeship
Gmina Zduny, Łódź Voivodeship